Pedro González-Bueno y Bocos (12 January 1896 – 30 January 1985), most commonly known as Pedro González Bueno, was a Spanish politician who served as Minister of Trade Union Organization and Action of Spain between 1938 and 1939, during the Francoist dictatorship.

References

1896 births
1985 deaths
Government ministers during the Francoist dictatorship
Labour ministers of Spain
FET y de las JONS politicians